Yordanka Asenova Fandakova (born 12 April 1962) is a Bulgarian politician and Mayor of Sofia. She is the first woman to hold this position. She was elected on 15 November 2009, after defeating the Bulgarian Socialist Party contender Georgi Kadiev. Fandakova is a member of the conservative GERB party.

Early life and education
Fandakova was born in Samokov, Sofia Province. She graduated the 35th Russian Language School in Sofia and the University of Sofia, majoring in Russian Studies. She is married and has a daughter. She was a teacher (from 1985) and head teacher (since 1998) at the 73rd secondary school for foreign languages "Vladislav Gramatik" in Sofia. She became Deputy Mayor of Sofia Municipality of Culture, Education, Sports and Prevention of Abuse in 2007.

Political career
Fandakova was elected Member of Parliament for GERB in the National Assembly in the 2009 Bulgarian parliamentary election and was made Minister of Education, Youth and Science.

In October Fandakova took a leave because of campaign-trail for mayor elections in Sofia and was substituted by Sergei Ignatov, Deputy Minister of Education and Science  who after she won election was appointed as the new Minister of Education and Science.

On 15 November 2009, she was elected as mayor of Sofia. Fandakova received 66.23% of the vote in the elections held on 15 November 2009. The Socialist Party contender Georgi Kadiev received 27.71%, with a turnout of 23.17%.

She ran for another term as Mayor of Sofia in the 2019 Bulgarian local elections.

References

External links
 Biography

Sofia University alumni
1962 births
Living people
Members of the National Assembly (Bulgaria)
Women mayors of places in Bulgaria
Mayors of Sofia
People from Samokov
GERB politicians
Government ministers of Bulgaria
Women government ministers of Bulgaria
21st-century Bulgarian politicians
21st-century Bulgarian women politicians